Male Lese is a small settlement on the right bank of the Krka River in the Municipality of Ivančna Gorica in central Slovenia. The area is part of the historical region of Lower Carniola. The municipality is now included in the Central Slovenia Statistical Region. 

A small chapel-shrine in the settlement is dedicated to the Virgin Mary and dates to the late 19th century.

References

External links

Male Lese on Geopedia

Populated places in the Municipality of Ivančna Gorica